Clifford Walmsley (25 November 1910 – 1983) was an English professional association footballer who played as a goalkeeper.

References

1910 births
1983 deaths
Footballers from Burnley
English footballers
Association football goalkeepers
Burnley F.C. players
Manchester City F.C. players
Reading F.C. players
Rochdale A.F.C. players
English Football League players